Eduard Georgyevich Bagritsky (February 16, 1934) was an important Russian and Soviet poet of the Constructivist School.

He was a Neo-Romantic early in his poetic career; he was also a part of the so-called Odessa School of Russian writers (which also included Isaak Babel, Yuri Olesha, Valentin Katayev, Vera Inber, Ilya Ilf and Yevgeni Petrov, among others). A large number of this school's writers were Odessa natives who often incorporated Ukrainian inflections and vocabulary into their writing.

Biography
Born Eduard Godelevich Dzyubin in Odessa to a Jewish middle-class family, most of his creative career took place in Moscow.  After his early death from asthma, his friends helped to publish several of his works posthumously to provide financial assistance to his family.  Isaak Babel, for example, planned to write a screenplay based on Bagritsky's long poem "Duma about Opanas" (the script was never finished and was eventually lost).

Bagritsky was heavily influenced by the Russian Revolution and Civil War. His poetry often touches on the subjects of violence, revolutionary morality, sexuality and its interethnic sociological problems. His worldview was extremely unsentimental, and earned him much invective from detractors from all sides who saw his poetry as vindictive toward both his Jewish origins and the host Russian culture.

In his book Russian Poet/Soviet Jew: The Legacy of Eduard Bagritskii (2000), Maxim D. Shrayer investigated the path of this major Jewish poet writing in the Russian language and examined Bagritsky's contested legacy. The book included English translations of Bagrtisky's works, among them his long poem February (1933–34).

In his poetry of the last period of his life Bagritsky managed to covertly criticise the growing oppressive Stalinist regime. He died in Moscow in 1934, aged 38.

Family
Bagritsky's wife, Lidia Gustavovna Suok (of Czech and Austrian descent), had two sisters who also married noted writers: Olga married Yuri Olesha and Serafima married Vladimir Narbut. Bagritsky's son Vsevolod (killed early in World War II) was also a notable Russian poet, whose fiancée Yelena Bonner (eventually the wife of Andrei Sakharov) later was a notable Russian dissident.

See also
Silver Age of Russian Poetry

Notes

External links

Article about Bagritsky in the YIVO Encyclopediad of Jews in Eastern Europe
 Eduard Bagritsky. Poems
 Bargitsky in English
 P. Barenboim, B. Meshcheryakov — Flanders in Moscow and Odessa:: poet Eduard Bagritskii (Bagritsky) as the Till Ulenspiegel of Russian literature. An HTML version of the book on the Flemish theme and opposition to Stalinism in the poetical legacy of Eduard Bagritskii (Bagritsky). Complete translations of the poems comprising the “Flemish” cycle. This book in print.

1895 births
1934 deaths
Writers from Odesa
People from Odessky Uyezd
Odesa Jews
Russian male poets
Jewish poets
20th-century Russian male writers
20th-century Russian poets
Russian military personnel of World War I
Soviet military personnel of the Russian Civil War
Burials at Novodevichy Cemetery